Harta may refer to:

 Harta, Hungary
 Harta, Poland
 Harta (magazine), a Japanese seinen manga magazine